Nicholas Fantini, better known as Evergreen, abbreviated to Egreen or E-Green (June 19, 1984), is an Italian rapper born in Bogotà, Colombia.

Biography 
Born in Bogotà to an Italian father and a Colombian mother, he lived in Colombia for three years and later moved to the United States of America. For a short time he also lived in Geneva and in 1999 he arrived in Italy, settling in Busto Arsizio. The numerous trips during childhood allow him to learn 4 languages (Spanish, English, French and Italian) and to get in touch with very varied cultures and musical styles. 

Arrived in Italy he immediately began his career as a rapper, participating in jam and coming into contact with the Hip-Hop scene first in Varese and then in Milan. He made his first demo in 2002, together with Toni Alti and dj Sen, F.U.R.S. (Frustrated Unreleased Rap Shit), as a collection of unreleased tracks in 2006 and two mixtapes between 2010 and 2011: I Spit Vol.0 and I Spit Vol.1. Over time he became known and began to record the first EPs and mixtapes, until in 2011 he joined the Unlimited Struggle label. In this period he publishes the EPs Entropia and Bricks & Hammers, as well as his first official album, Il cuore e la fame, which collects extensive critical acclaim. 

Later, in 2014 he released a 7-track EP entitled Entropia 2.

After the collaboration with the collective for professional reasons, he decides to publish an album independently, relying on the crowdfunding platform Musicraiser, through a campaign that ended with a record number of 1818 subscriptions for a collection of over 69,000 euros, surpassing any other similar project ever attempted in Italy. The result of the campaign is the record Beats & Hate, Egreen's second official work.

Discography

Albums 

 2013 - Il cuore e la fame
 2015 - Beats & Hate
 2016 - More Hate
 2018 - Entropia 3
 2019 - LO VE (with Nex Cassel)
 2019 - OG’S (with Craig G and The WZA)
 2020 - Fine Primo Tempo
 2022 - Nicolás

Mixtapes 

 2009 - I Spit Vol. 0
 2010 - I Spit Vol.1
 2015 - I Spit Vol. 1.3
 2017 - Bengala Mixtape (with Attila)
 2020 - I Spit Vol. 2

EPs 

 2008 - F.U.R.S. (Frustrated Unreleased Rap Shit)
 2010 - Byters - The Unautorised Remixes (with DJ Yodha & L-Blixxx)
 2011 - Entropia EP
 2012 - Bricks & Hammers
 2014 - Entropia 2
 2016 - A.F.A. EP

Collaborations

References

External links 

 Egreen on Discogs
 Official site, on egreenmusic.com

Italian rappers